Stockholm is an unincorporated community in Stockholm Township, Wright County, Minnesota, United States.  The community is located along Wright County Road 30 near Quinlar Avenue SW.

Nearby places include Cokato, Howard Lake, Silver Lake, Dassel, and Grass Lake–Stockholm Wildlife Management Area.

Wright County Road 3 is also in the immediate area.

References

Unincorporated communities in Minnesota
Unincorporated communities in Wright County, Minnesota